The European Journal of Education is a quarterly peer-reviewed academic journal on education, published quarterly by Wiley-Blackwell. Each issue contains a section that covers a particular theme and contributions for this section are commissioned.

External links

Education journals
Quarterly journals
Wiley-Blackwell academic journals
English-language journals
Publications established in 1966